Jahmyr Gibbs (born March 20, 2002) is an American football running back. He played college football at Georgia Tech before transferring to Alabama in 2022.

Early life and high school career
Gibbs grew up in Dalton, Georgia, and attended Dalton High School. He rushed for 897 yards and 10 touchdowns as a sophomore and 1,431 yards and 20 touchdowns in his junior season. As a senior, Gibbs led the state with 2,554 rushing yards and 40 touchdowns and was named first team all-state, the Georgia 6-A 2020 Offensive Player of the Year and a first team All-American by Sports Illustrated. He was also invited to play in the 2020 All-American Bowl. Gibbs finished his high school career with 4,882 rushing yards and 70 touchdowns. 

Gibbs was initially rated a three-star recruit and committed to play college football at Georgia Tech at the end of his junior year over offers from Michigan, Texas A&M, and North Carolina. Gibbs was re-rated as a four-star prospect during his senior year and was further recruited by Florida, Georgia and Alabama, but ultimately decided to maintain his commitment to Georgia Tech.

College career

Georgia Tech
After missing the Yellow Jackets' season opener, Gibbs made his collegiate debut the following week against Central Florida and returned the opening kickoff 75 yards. He finished the game with 219 all-purpose yards and two touchdowns and was named the Atlantic Coast Conference (ACC) Freshman of the Week. Gibbs scored at least one touchdown and five total touchdowns in his first three collegiate games. He finished the season with 89 carries for 460 yards and four touchdowns, 24 receptions for 303 yards and three touchdowns, and eight kickoff returns for 205 yards and was named honorable mention All-ACC as a return specialist.

Alabama 

Gibbs transferred to the University of Alabama to play for the Alabama Crimson Tide in 2022.

References

External links
Alabama Crimson Tide
Georgia Tech Yellow Jackets bio

Living people
American football running backs
Georgia Tech Yellow Jackets football players
Alabama Crimson Tide football players
Players of American football from Georgia (U.S. state)
People from Dalton, Georgia
2002 births